Several earthquake catalogues and historical sources describe the 893 Ardabil earthquake as a destructive earthquake that struck the city of Ardabil, Iran, on 23 March 893. The magnitude is unknown, but the death toll was reported to be very large. The USGS, in their "List of Earthquakes with 50,000 or More Deaths", give an estimate that 150,000 were killed, which would make it the ninth deadliest earthquake in history.

Although the Ardabil area is prone to numerous earthquakes and was struck by a major earthquake in 1997, the 893 event is, in fact, considered to be a "mistaken" earthquake, derived from misreadings of the original Armenian writings about the 893 earthquake in Dvin, Armenia; the Arabic name for Dvin is Dabil.

"Mistaken" earthquake 
At about midnight on 28 December 893, the night after a lunar eclipse, Dvin, then the capital of Armenia, was devastated by an earthquake. Most buildings were destroyed, and at least 30,000 people died. This event was recorded by contemporary Armenian and Arabic chroniclers, including Ibn al-Jawzi. However, the Arabic name for the city is Dabil, and this led the 14th-century writer Ibn Kathir to place the earthquake in Ardabil in Azerbaijan. Ibn Kathir was then quoted by al-Suyuti in the 15th century. Further writers also placed the earthquake in Ardabil, and added some details, such as waters drying up, while changing others, such as making the eclipse preceding the earthquake solar instead of lunar. It is clear, however, that all these reports are descriptions of the 893 Dvin event.

See also 
List of earthquakes in Iran
List of historical earthquakes

References

0893 Ardabil
9th-century earthquakes
893
History of Ardabil
History of Ardabil Province
9th century in Iran
9th century in the Abbasid Caliphate